Taunton Town Football Club is a semi-professional football club based in Taunton, Somerset. The club is affiliated to the Somerset County FA.

After being formed in 1947, they were admitted into the Western League in 1954. They struggled over the next ten years, and it was not until the 1970s that the club started to prosper. Having won the Western League in 1968–69, the club then finished as runners-up in the same league in four successive seasons from 1973. They gained promotion to the Southern League in 1977 and purchased their ground from the local council. In the early 1980s they dropped back down into the Western League for financial reasons, but did not enjoy further success until 1989–90. The following twelve seasons saw the club win the title on four more occasions (1995–96, 1998–99, 1999–2000 and 2000–01) and finish as runners-up four times (1993–94, 1996–97, 1997–98 and 2001–02).

In 2001 the club won the FA Vase, which it had narrowly missed out on seven years earlier. Following their string of good results, Taunton rejoined the Southern League for the 2002–03 season. The club are currently members of the National League South for the 2022-23 season, following their promotion from the Southern League Premier Division South at the end of the 2021-22 season.

History
The first Taunton Association Football Club was formed on 11 September 1889 at the George Hotel.

In December 1947 a group of businessmen founded Taunton Football Club, and the club played its first match in Easter the following year.  The club joined the Somerset Senior League, in which they played until 1953.  During this year the club gained admission to the Western League for the first time.  In the same year, the club also moved into their present ground on Wordsworth Drive, which they leased from Taunton Borough Council.  During these early years of the club they battled financial problems and relied upon their Supporters Club.

In 1968–69, the club enjoyed success for the first time, winning the Western League under the management of Doug Hillard. Over the following years Taunton Town continued to prosper on the pitch, finishing as Western League runners-up in four consecutive seasons from 1973 until 1976. During this time the club bought their Wordsworth Drive ground from the local council and installed floodlights. In 1977 they were promoted into the Southern League (Southern Section). Two years later, following the opening of the M5 motorway, they moved into the Midlands Section of the league.

In 1981, the club became a limited company, and the club's board decided that competing in the Southern League was too much of a financial burden; resulting in a drop back into the Western League for the 1983–84 season. The club finished as league champions for the second time in 1989–90 and followed this win up with further success, winning the league again in 1995–96, 1998–99, 1999–2000 and 2000–01. They also finished as runners-up on four occasions; in 1993–94, 1996–97, 1997–98 and 2001–02.  Following their runners-up position in 2001–02, and the improved financial position of the club compared to twenty years earlier, the club was successful in its application to re-enter the Southern League.  The club have remained in this league ever since, and after the restructuring of the English football league system, the club were placed in the Southern Football League Division One South & West.

The club reached the final of the FA Vase in 1994, where they lost in extra time to Diss Town. A second FA Vase finals appearance in 2001 resulted in greater success, Taunton Town beating Berkhamsted Town 2–1. In 2016–17 they reached the first round proper of the FA Cup for only the second time in their history, where they faced Barrow and held them to a 2–2 draw but were beaten away in the replay 2–1.

In 2017–18, Taunton celebrated promotion from the Southern League South & West for the first time in their history, clinching the title after a home 3–2 win over Kidlington.

In 2018-19 Taunton narrowly missed out on promotion to the National League South after losing to Poole Town on penalties at the Viridor Stadium during their Southern League Premier playoff game.

On 20 November 2019, Taunton Town equaled the record for the longest penalty shoot out in English footballing history beating Truro City 12-11 after 34 penalties in the Southern League challenge cup.  Goalkeeper Lloyd Irish scored one and missed another whilst also saving three penalties with Truro missing the target another 3 times before Jack Rice finally scored the winning penalty after 34 minutes of drama.

On 23 April 2022, Taunton won the final match of the 2021-22 season against third-placed Farnborough, securing their place as champions at the top of the league and promotion to the National League South for the first time in the club’s history.

Stadium

Taunton Town play their home games at Wordsworth Drive. When they were formed, Taunton Town played at a variety of grounds in the Taunton area, including Mountfields, French Weir, Victoria Park and Huish Old Boys.  They then moved to Denman's Park, Haines Hill where they remained until 1953.  During that season the club moved to Wordsworth Drive (capacity 2,500) in Taunton, where they have remained ever since.  Initially they leased the ground from Taunton Borough Council, but in the 1970s the club purchased the ground from the council and installed floodlights. The ground has covered stands on all four sides of the pitch.

Current squad

Management

Honours

League 
Southern League Premier Division (Tier 7)
Champions (1): 2021–22
Southern League Division One West (Tier 8)
Champions (1): 2017–18
Western League
Champions (6):  1968–69, 1989–90, 1995–96, 1998–99, 1999–2000, 2000–01

Cups 
Alan Young Cup 
Winners (2): 1973–74, 1975–76 (shared with Falmouth Town)<ref name="awardwinners">{{cite web|title=Award **Winners|url=http://www.toolstationleague.com/history2.php|publisher=Toolstation Western League|access-date=16 December 2017}}</ref>
Combination Challenge Cup 
Winners (2): 1990–91, 1993–94, 1994–95
Combination Subsidiary League Cup 
Winners (3): 1991–92, 1992–93, 1993–94
FA Vase
Winners (1): 2000–01
Somerset Senior Cup
Winners (1): 1969–70
Somerset Premier Cup
Winners (5): 2002–03, 2005–06, 2013–14, 2014–15, 2016–17

Taunton Town Ladies
Taunton Town had a ladies football team; Taunton Town Ladies Football Club''', who played in the South West Women's Football League Premier Division. They first played league football in 1986. In 1990–91, the ladies won the Division Two Cup of the newly formed South West Regional Women's Football League.
The club ceased to exist at the end of the 2014–15 season.

See also
Taunton Town F.C. players
Taunton Town F.C. managers

References
General

Specific

External links

Taunton Town F.C. channel

Sport in Taunton
Football clubs in Somerset
Southern Football League clubs
Association football clubs established in 1947
1947 establishments in England
Football clubs in England
Western Football League
National League (English football) clubs